Ligulella is an extinct genus of ray-finned fish that lived in what is now the Democratic Republic of the Congo during the Middle Jurassic epoch. It contains one species, Ligulella sluysi. Ligulella is the only member of the family Ligulellidae and the order Ligulelliformes.

References

Prehistoric teleostei
Prehistoric ray-finned fish genera
Middle Jurassic fish
Paleontology in the Democratic Republic of the Congo
Fossil taxa described in 1955